Radiator Springs is a fictional small Arizona town and the principal setting of the Disney/Pixar franchise Cars. A composite of multiple real-world locations on the historic U.S. Route 66 from Chicago to Los Angeles, it is most prominently featured in the 2006 film, and is home to a majority of the franchise's characters. Cars Land, a part of Disney California Adventure in Disneyland Resort, is based on the setting.

Vicinity

In the movie Cars, the town of Radiator Springs is seen on a map as situated in northwest Arizona, within fictional Carburetor County.

In one restaurant, John Lasseter ordered one of every item on the menu for the Pixar group and spent four hours talking to the owner, absorbing information on the efforts to rebuild the historic byway to its neon-lit heyday.

Much of the story is based on the recollections of barber Angel Delgadillo in the Route 66 town of Seligman, Arizona, where business withered soon after the opening of I-40.

Flo's V8 café is designed to look like a V8 engine head on, with a circular air filter, tappet covers, spark plugs, pistons and connecting rods as the supports for the roof. The blinking neon lights on the spark plugs blink in the firing order of a Ford flathead V8.

Route 66

Many characters and places in the film are directly inspired by real Route 66 places and people.

To quote the Pixar crew:
 "As we traveled on Route 66, we were privileged to visit many places and to meet a number of people who live and work alongside 'The Mother Road'. The following is a list of the places and people we wanted to honor by including their names in our 'Special Thanks' credits at the end of the film."

Among the many references to Route 66 landmarks and personalities:
 The Cozy Cone Motel's design is based on the two Wigwam Motels along Route 66, in Holbrook, Arizona and Rialto, California. These were once two out of seven built motels, with individual cabins shaped like teepees. Three Wigwam Motels remain; the third (and oldest) is in Cave City, Kentucky, far from Route 66. The recently restored Tee Pee Motel in Wharton, Texas, south of Houston, is of similar design but unrelated. The name "Cozy Cone" was inspired by the Cozy Dog Drive-In of Springfield, Illinois, which lays claim to being the birthplace of the corn dog.
 The character "Fillmore", referring to the famous San Francisco music venue The Fillmore, was at one time to be named "Waldmire" after Bob Waldmire, a self-proclaimed hippie artist known to Route 66 fans for his detailed pen-and-ink maps and postcards of the route. Though Waldmire's family owns the Cozy Dog Drive-In, Bob, having since become a vegan, preferred not to see his name put on a character that would become a McDonald's Happy Meal toy.
 Lizzie's Curio Shop in Radiator Springs resembles the Route 66 jumble of memorabilia and knick-knacks at Hackberry General Store in Hackberry, Arizona and the Sand Hills Curiosity Shop, aka the City Meat Market building in Erick, Oklahoma. The yellow billboard for Lizzie's Curio Shop reading "HERE IT IS" with an image of a Model T is based on the Jack Rabbit Trading Post signage in Joseph City, Arizona.
 Sheriff is voiced by Michael Wallis, an American historian and author of Route 66: The Mother Road.
 The characters "Flo" and "Sally" are based on Fran Houser of the Midpoint Café and Dawn Welch of the Rock Café respectively.

Continuity
There are a few sights of the front page of a newspaper named The Daily Exhaust, which serves primarily as a vehicle to explain the NASCAR history behind the Fabulous Hudson Hornet of the early 1950s.

During the 2006 film's closing credits, the characters are at a drive-in watching clips of the Pixar films "Toy Car Story" (Toy Story), "Monster Trucks, Inc." (Monsters, Inc.) and "Bug" as in Volkswagen Beetle (A Bug's Life), whose characters have been rendered as vehicles in the style of Cars. Mack the red Mack Super-Liner comments that "they're just using the same actor over and over", an in-joke referring to John Ratzenberger, who voiced Mack and some of the characters featured in the clips. The cinema itself is similar in design to an NRHP-listed 66 Drive-In in Carthage, Missouri, but without the later addition of widescreen and FM radio.

The group of small birds from the 2000 Pixar short film For the Birds made a cameo appearance in Cars. As Mack is en route to California at 17:44 in the film, the group of small birds can briefly be seen (and heard) sitting on their familiar telephone wire. In addition, the Pizza Planet truck from Toy Story also makes a cameo outside of the race track, at the final race in the movie.

Other settings
The rail grade crossing at which Lightning McQueen outruns a freight train on his way to Radiator Springs is protected by a pair of antique "upper-quadrant" wigwag crossing signals which accurately depict those once made by the Magnetic Signal Company in both appearance and start-up. Few are left in actual operation in the United States, and many have been replaced with modern crossing gates, red lights and bells. For decades Wig Wag signals were used in Point Richmond California where Pixar’s original headquarters was located. 

"Ornament Valley" is a reference to Monument Valley. This is not on Route 66, but is a side trip in northern Arizona Spring Hills city. 

Willy's Butte resembles the landmark of Mexican Hat, Utah, but also resembles a classic Pontiac hood ornament.

The track on which the opening race (Motor Speedway of the South) takes place is based on an enlarged version of Bristol Motor Speedway. The venue for the Piston Cup tiebreaker race (the Los Angeles International Speedway) is a conglomeration of the Los Angeles Memorial Coliseum, the Arroyo Seco in Pasadena where the Rose Bowl is located, as well as the Auto Club Speedway in Fontana.

The sign "City of Emeryville – Closed for the race" is a nod to Pixar's headquarters in Emeryville, California in the San Francisco Bay Area.

See also
 Radium Springs, New Mexico

References

External links

U.S. Route 66
Fictional populated places in Arizona
Cars (franchise)